Mara-Il is the only king of Nagar known by name, and the first known historical figure from the Jezirah region. Most of the texts record the ruler of Nagar using his title "En", without mentioning a name. Only in Ebla was a name mentioned: Mara-Il; he ruled a little more than a generation before Nagar's destruction c. 2300 BC, and was most probably the "En" recorded in other texts, including the ones from Nabada.

Amar-AN
An inscription from Mari records a certain Amar-AN of the land of Nagar, and he could be identical to Mara-Il (whose name in Ebla was written ma-ra-AN). Four scholars, Marco Bonechi, Amalia Catagnoti, Maria Vittoria Tonietti and Walther Sallaberger, suggested a tentative relation between the element Amar and the element Ma-ra but both Catagnoti and Tonietti admit to the difficulty of this identification and have reservations.

Notes

References

Citations

Sources

 
 
 
 

Tell Brak
24th-century BC rulers